Buffalo Township is a township in Dunklin County, in the U.S. state of Missouri.

Buffalo Township was established in 1845, and named for a creek of the same name within its borders. The largest and only city in the township is Cardwell.

References

Townships in Missouri
Townships in Dunklin County, Missouri